The Committee on Budgets (BUDG) is a committee of the European Parliament. It has 41 members plus 39 substitute members. The committee's current chair is Jean Arthuis, who has held this position since 7 July 2014.

Membership

References

External links
 Official Homepage 

Budget of the European Union
Budgets